Hakea loranthifolia is a shrub of the family Proteaceae and is endemic to Western Australia. It has an open growth habit, stiff egg-shaped leaves with longitudinal veins, smooth grey bark and white flowers from July to September.

Description
It is a sparingly branched shrub with smooth branchlets by flowering. The leaves have one to three longitudinal veins on the top and three to five underneath, tapering at the base, smooth edges and gradually tapering at the apex. The inflorescence consists of  10-16 white flowers in a cluster of 1-3 per leaf axil. Flowering occurs from July to September.

Taxonomy and naming
The species was first formally described by the botanist Carl Meissner in 1845 as part of Johann Georg Christian Lehmann's work Proteaceae. Plantae Preissianae.
The specific epithet means "Loranthus-leaved".

Distribution
It is endemic to an area in the Wheatbelt region of Western Australia between Northam in the north down to Narrogin in the south. It is found in sandy gravelly soils often around laterite. It is often found on and around breakaways and is a part of the understorey in open Eucalyptus wandoo and Eucalyptus accedens woodland communities.

References

loranthifolia
Eudicots of Western Australia
Plants described in 1845
Taxa named by Carl Meissner